The International Journal of Social Psychiatry is a bimonthly peer-reviewed medical journal that covers research in the field of social psychiatry. The editor-in-chief is Dinesh Bhugra (King's College London). It was established in 1955 and is published by SAGE Publications.

Abstracting and indexing
The journal is abstracted and indexed in: Academic Search Premier, Current Contents, Family Index Database, International Nursing Index, Index Medicus/MEDLINE/PubMed, Scopus, and the Social Sciences Citation Index. According to the Journal Citation Reports, the journal has a 2021 impact factor of 10.468.

References

External links

SAGE Publishing academic journals
English-language journals
Publications established in 1955
Psychiatry journals
Bimonthly journals